Taylor is a town in Navajo County, Arizona, United States. It was founded by Mormon settlers in January 1878, several months before the neighboring community of Snowflake. Taylor straddles Silver Creek, flowing from the nearby White Mountains to the Little Colorado River on Arizona's Colorado Plateau. According to the 2010 census, the population of the town is 4,112. The town was named for John Taylor, the third president of the Church of Jesus Christ of Latter-day Saints.

There is no postal home delivery in Taylor.  Residents within a certain radius of the Post Office who produce proof of Taylor residency are allocated a small PO box free of charge.  Residents of Snowflake have postal delivery.  Lack of postal delivery is also a problem when using services that validate postal addresses, as none will validate in Taylor.

Railroads
Taylor was once served by the Apache Railway. The tracks were constructed between 1917–1920 and extended from the Santa Fe Railway at Holbrook, Arizona, to Snowflake and then via Taylor to the forests at McNary. The Snowflake to McNary line was abandoned in 1984.

Geography
Taylor is located at  (34.465762, -110.104385).

Climate
Taylor experiences a four-season climate with a warm (sometimes hot) summer, mild autumn, mild to cold winter and cool, windy spring. Typical high temperatures hover around 90 °F (32 °C) during July and August and 30 to 55 °F (13 °C) in December/January.

Demographics

As of the census of 2000, there were 3,176 people, 946 households, and 771 families residing in the town. The racial makeup of the town was 89.0% White, 0.5% Black or African American, 5.3% Native American, 0.1% Asian, 0.1% Pacific Islander, 2.7% from other races, and 2.3% from two or more races. 9.2% of the population were Hispanic or Latino of any race.

There were 946 households, out of which 48.8% had children under the age of 18 living with them, 68.6% were married couples living together, 9.1% had a female householder with no husband present, and 18.4% were non-families. 16.9% of all households were made up of individuals, and 7.3% had someone living alone who was 65 years of age or older. The average household size was 3.36 and the average family size was 3.81.

In the town, the population was spread out, with 40.1% under the age of 18, 9.2% from 18 to 24, 24.7% from 25 to 44, 17.7% from 45 to 64, and 8.2% who were 65 years of age or older. The median age was 26 years. For every 100 females, there were 99.1 males. For every 100 females age 18 and over, there were 93.0 males.

The median income for a household in the town was $32,577, and the median income for a family was $36,518. Males had a median income of $33,750 versus $20,243 for females. The per capita income for the town was $11,918. About 13.9% of families and 15.0% of the population were below the poverty line, including 18.2% of those under age 18 and 8.8% of those age 65 or over.

Education
Taylor is a part of the Snowflake Unified School District.

Two schools, Taylor Elementary School and Taylor Intermediate School, are located in Taylor.

Snowflake Junior High School and Snowflake High School, in Snowflake, serve Taylor.

See also
 The Church of Jesus Christ of Latter-day Saints in Arizona

References

External links
 Town website

Populated places established in 1878
Towns in Navajo County, Arizona
White Mountains (Arizona)
1878 establishments in Arizona Territory